56 Aquilae is a single star in the equatorial constellation of Aquila. 56 Aquilae is its Flamsteed designation. Its apparent visual magnitude is 5.79, meaning it is barely visible to the naked eye as a dim, orange-hued point of light, under ideal viewing conditions. The star is located at a distance of around 580 light years away from the Sun, based on parallax.

This is an aging giant star with a stellar classification of K5 III, having exhausted the supply of hydrogen at its core and expanded to 42 times the Sun's radius. It is radiating 391 times the luminosity of the Sun from its photosphere at an effective temperature of 3,972 K. 56 Aquilae is a double star, but it does not appear to be a binary star system. It is one of the double stars profiled in Admiral William Henry Smyth's 1864 work, Sidereal Chromatics.

References

External links
 
 CCDM 19541-0834
 Image 56 Aquilae

K-type giants
Double stars
Aquila (constellation)
Durchmusterung objects
Aquilae, 56
188154
188154
7584